Stéphane Galbert (born February 7, 1975 in Schœlcher, Martinique) is a member of the French bobsleigh team that competed at the 2006 Winter Olympics.

References

1975 births
Living people
People from Schœlcher
Martiniquais sportspeople
French people of Martiniquais descent
French male bobsledders
Bobsledders at the 2006 Winter Olympics
Olympic bobsledders of France